Dorothea "Dora" Köring (11 July 1880 – 13 February 1945) was a female tennis player from Germany.

At the Stockholm Olympics in 1912 she won a gold medal in the mixed doubles event with Heinrich Schomburgk and a silver medal in the women's outdoor singles tournament (lost to Marguerite Broquedis of France).

Köring died in her house in Dresden during the bombing of Dresden in World War II.

References

German female tennis players
1880 births
1945 deaths
Tennis players at the 1912 Summer Olympics
Olympic tennis players of Germany
Olympic gold medalists for Germany
Olympic silver medalists for Germany
Sportspeople from Chemnitz
Deaths by airstrike during World War II
German civilians killed in World War II
Olympic medalists in tennis
Medalists at the 1912 Summer Olympics
20th-century German women